Kevin Aluwi (born 1 September 1986) is an Indonesian entrepreneur. In 2010, he founded Gojek, Indonesia's first startup company valued over US$10 billion.

Background 
As the co-founder of Gojek, Kevin Aluwi plays significant roles in navigating the company's journey into becoming Southeast Asia's leading technology platform whose mission is to empower the informal sector and MSMEs in Indonesia.

Joining Gojek in 2014, Kevin has since held a strategic role in adopting business intelligence data to track and optimize critical elements such as pricing, driver-partners income, as well as in structuring customers retention strategy. Kevin builds and established data science within Gojek ecosystem. As Gojek Group expands, Kevin leads all product streams to ensure continuous innovation and growth.

In Oct 2019, Kevin, along with Andre Soelistyo, Gojek Group president was promoted as co-CEOs after the departure of CEO Nadiem Makarim who stepped down to join Indonesia president Joko Widodo’s cabinet.

Education 
Kevin holds a bachelor's degree in Corporate Finance, Entrepreneurship and International Relations from the University of Southern California - Marshall School of Business in Los Angeles, California, USA.

Early career and business 
Prior to joining Gojek, Kevin spent two years in Zalora Indonesia as the Head of Business Intelligence. Before Zalora, he was the Business Development Manager in Merah Putih. Inc.; following the start of his career as an Investment Banking analyst in Salem Partners LLC.

Awards and international recognition 

 “Forbes 30 Under 30 Asia” in Consumers Technology category in 2016 - an award to recognize young innovator figures who succeeded in making changes and disrupting industries.

References

1986 births
University of Southern California alumni
Living people
Indonesian company founders
21st-century Indonesian businesspeople
Indonesian chief executives